Grady O'Neal Jackson (born January 21, 1973) is a former American football defensive tackle. He was drafted by the Oakland Raiders in the sixth round of the 1997 NFL Draft. He played college football at Knoxville College.

Jackson also played for the New Orleans Saints, Green Bay Packers, Jacksonville Jaguars, Atlanta Falcons, Detroit Lions and Florida Tuskers.

College career
Grady Jackson played defensive tackle at Knoxville College, after transferring from Hinds Community College. While at Hinds, he was a two-time Junior College All-American and the National Junior College Player of the Year following the 1995-1996 seasons.

Professional career

Green Bay Packers
Jackson was represented by agent Drew Rosenhaus. Before the 2005 NFL season, Jackson said he would hold-out of training camp in order to secure a new contract with the Packers. However, he reported for training camp on the first day. Several days later, however, Jackson told reporters that he no longer felt wanted in the Packers organization and requested to be released or traded to another team, but later retracted those statements, and played out the 2005 season without a new contract.

First stint with Falcons
In 2006, as a member of the Atlanta Falcons, Jackson led the league in tackles for a loss. On October 23, 2007, the Atlanta Falcons released Jackson.

Jacksonville Jaguars
On October 30, 2007 the Jacksonville Jaguars signed Jackson to a one-year contract.

Second stint with Falcons
Jackson was re-signed by the Falcons on July 28, 2008. On December 2, 2008, the NFL reported that he had failed a drug test and they would further investigate the circumstances before deciding upon disciplinary action.

Detroit Lions
On March 4, 2009, Jackson was signed by the Detroit Lions.

Jackson was released on March 5, 2010.

References

1973 births
Living people
American football defensive tackles
Atlanta Falcons players
Detroit Lions players
Florida Tuskers players
Green Bay Packers players
Hinds Eagles football players
Jacksonville Jaguars players
Knoxville Bulldogs football players
New Orleans Saints players
Oakland Raiders players
People from Greensboro, Alabama
Players of American football from Alabama